Dourin (Arabic: دورين) is a Syrian village in the Qatana District of the Rif Dimashq Governorate. According to the Syria Central Bureau of Statistics (CBS), Dourin had a population of 750 in the 2004 census.

References

Populated places in Qatana District